The Democracy Way (Straße der Demokratie) is a 280 km long tourist trail between Freiburg im Breisgau and Frankfurt am Main, made up of sites linked to development of democracy in the area during the revolutions of 1848 in the German states.

Grand Duchy of Baden
1848 in Germany
Revolutions of 1848
German tourist routes